This is a list of films filmed and set in New Zealand.

The earliest short films — 1898–1910

The early years — 1911–1940

The quiet years — 1941–1975

The early modern era — 1976–1985

The international era — 1986–

See also
 List of films based on location
 List of New Zealand films
 Cinema of New Zealand

References
Martin, H., and Edwards, S. (1997) New Zealand film, 1912-1996. Auckland: Oxford University Press. 

 
New Zealand